Greenwayodendron suaveolens is a species of plant in the genus Greenwayodendron, and a member of the Annonaceae family.

Distribution
It is widely distributed across West and Central Africa, from Ivory Coast to Angola.

Three subspecies are known. The nominate subspecies is widespread, whereas subsp. gabonicum (Pellegr. ex Le Thomas) Verdc. and subsp. usambaricum Verdc. are both more restricted in range. It is possible that future research may elevate the subspecies to species level.

Recreational and medicinal use
The Aka people of Central Africa smoke the leaves, locally called "motunga," recreationally, and also prepare it into a tea. This may have an antihelmintic effect.

References 

Annonaceae